Matthew Derr (born July 12, 1967) was a higher education leader and was appointed the 11th President of Sterling College in May 2012. In December 2010, the Council for Advancement and Support of Education awarded Derr with the organization's Chief Executive Leadership Award and the Great Lakes Colleges Association recognized his efforts on behalf of liberal education with a visiting fellowship.

Professional life

Under Derr's leadership, Sterling, which is among the smallest liberal arts colleges in the United States, has experienced a period of rapid growth in student enrollment and philanthropic support, through the largest successful fundraising campaign in institutional history. Sterling expanded its emphasis on global field studies in 2016 with support from the Endeavor Foundation and launched the Rian Fried Center for Sustainable Agriculture & Food Systems, including, in 2015, a continuing education program named the School of the New American Farmstead.

Personal life
Derr was born in Flint, Michigan. His grandparents and parents were autoworkers. He attended public schools before earning a Bachelor of Arts in History from Antioch College and Masters of Social Work in Community Organizing and Social Systems from the University of Michigan. He has also studied at the George Heyman Center for Philanthropy at New York University.

President Derr was one of a handful of openly gay college presidents in the United States.

References

1967 births
Living people
Heads of universities and colleges in the United States
Antioch College alumni
University of Michigan School of Social Work alumni
People from Craftsbury, Vermont